Ronco Biellese is a comune (municipality) in the Province of Biella in the Italian region Piedmont, located about  northeast of Turin and about  northwest of Milan.

Ronco Biellese borders the following municipalities: Biella, Pettinengo, Ternengo, Valdengo, Vigliano Biellese, Zumaglia. It was in the past an important centre of terracotta manufacture.

Demographic evolution

See also
Zumaglia Castle

References
\

Cities and towns in Piedmont